Last Night is the eighth studio album by American electronica singer, songwriter, and musician Moby, released on March 29, 2008, by Mute Records. The album is a much more dance-oriented release than Moby's previous few albums.

Background and recording 
In October 2006, Moby released his greatest hits compilation Go – The Very Best of Moby. Following its release, he decided to start work on his next studio album, his first since Hotel in 2005. Moby adopted a conceptual theme in regard to the album's shape, structuring it like an "epic night out" in New York City, "moving from the building excitement of the early evening, to peak-time euphoria, to 2 a.m. confusion, and the blissful peace of the early morning New York City sunrise." Moby was influenced by this idea from living in Manhattan and being exposed to a variety of live dance music, which he wanted to reflect on Last Night: "I wanted to condense that 8 hour going out experience into 65 minutes",

The album was recorded in Moby's home studio in Manhattan and features a number of guest vocalists, including Wendy Starland, MC Grandmaster Caz (one of the writers of "Rapper's Delight", which boosted the popularity of sampling, a common method to make the music on Moby's 1999 album Play), Sylvia from the band Kudu, British MC Aynzli, and the Nigeria-based 419 Squad. Moby picked "Last Night" as his favourite track on the album.

On his official website, Moby stated that this album is "a lot more dance-oriented and electronic than my last few albums, probably as a result of all of the DJing I've been doing lately." Moby made the album as a tribute to his favorite city in the world:

Promotion and release 

"Disco Lies" was released as a single on January 21, 2008. The second single, "Alice", was released on March 10.

Last Night was released on March 29 by record label Mute. '
"I Love to Move in Here" was released on July 1, and the album's final single, "Ooh Yeah", was released on November 28.

Track listing 

Notes
Credited respectively as "Aynzli Jones and S.O.Simple and Smokey from 419 Squad".
"Degenerates" is an alternate mix of "Raining Again" b-side "It's OK".
"Last Night" (0:00–4:53) shares the track with hidden song "Lucy Vida" (4:54–9:23).

Release history

Charts

Weekly charts

Year-end charts

Certifications

References

External links 

 

2008 albums
Moby albums
Mute Records albums
Albums produced by Moby
Concept albums
New York City in fiction